The Sunshine Slam is a two-day college basketball tournament founded in 2019. The inaugural tournament in 2019 was a round-robin tournament held at Silver Spurs Arena in Kissimmee, FL. The Northeast Conference is the host of the tournament. The 2021 edition of the tournament will be played at the Ocean Center in Daytona Beach, Florida.

Brackets 
* – Denotes overtime period

2022

Regional Round Campus Games

Championship Rounds

2021  
Utah, Tulsa, URI, and Boston College were in one pod, while the other pod consisted of Bryant, Holy Cross, Air Force, and Bethune-Cookman. 2021 Format: Eight teams in two separate four-team bracketed tournaments.

Regional Round Campus Site Games

Championship Rounds

2019

References

External links
 Sunshine Slam

College men's basketball competitions in the United States
College basketball competitions
2019 establishments in Florida
Recurring sporting events established in 2019
Basketball competitions in Florida
Sports in Daytona Beach, Florida